Madhu Verma is Indian born environmental economist presently working as Chief Economist at WRI India. She has worked extensively on Economic Valuation & Green Accounting of Ecosystems & Biodiversity, Ecosystem-Economy Modelling, Tiger & Snow Leopard Habitat Valuation, Forest- Fiscal Federalism and Payment for Ecosystem Services.

Education and career 
She is a biological science graduate with MA, M.Phil. & Ph.D. in Economics with specialization in Regional Planning and Economic Growth from Barkatullah University, India. Till 2019, she worked as Professor in the department of Environment & Developmental Economics, at the  Indian Institute of Forest Management (IIFM), an autonomous organization of the Ministry of Environment, Forests and Climate Change, Government of India,  Bhopal, India. She has also established Centre for Ecological Services Management (CESM) in 2007 at IIFM with focus on research, training and consulting activities relating to Valuation and Modeling of ecosystem services, Green  Accounting and Payment for Ecosystem services and their linkages with biodiversity, culture, and livelihoods.

She is a Fulbright Fellow (2012), LEAD Fellow (2007) and World Bank EMCaB program's  EEOFC Grant awardee (2001) for post doc research at the University of Massachusetts (Amherst), UCAL(Berkeley)

She has authored the pioneer work of Economic Valuation of Tiger Reserves in India (2015 and 2019), which has influenced the policies and decision making process of the government

She has also authored and contributed  in several international reports like the UN's Millennium Ecosystem Assessment Report (2004–06); The Economics of Ecosystem and Biodiversity (TEEB) Reports (2007–11); and the Global Assessment of Resources for Implementing the Strategic Plan for Biodiversity 2011-2020.

She has 35 years of enriched work experience with many national and international institutes, Ministries like Environment, Forest and Climate Change, MoFinance, Forestry Commission & various Finance Commissions of India and United Nations bodies, World Bank and various international funding agencies and academic institute. She has traveled across the globe to more than 30 countries for work and has more than 40 publications in international and national journals, several books & Project Reports to her credit.

Awards and honors 
She has been recognized as INSEE (Indian Society for Ecological Economics) Fellow  in appreciation of her path breaking contributions in refining and honing ecological concepts to make them visible on the radar of policy makers. She has also recently been recognized by UN-REDD platform for ‘Women Working in Forests" on the occasion of International Women's Day of 2018. A feature on her work has been published in special issue of India today, a leading international magazine of India of 28 March 2018 on Madhya Pradesh under the category of trendsetters. She was also a panelist in the session on "Write Stuff: The state of Education" in the "India Today: The State of The State Conclave" held at Bhopal on 29 March 2018.
She was nominated as "Human Star" under "Day out with a Star" platform in 2017 at the India Environment Network, a Washington DC based network  to speak about Economic Valuation of Tiger  Reserves in India

Selected bibliography 

 Making the hidden visible: Economic valuation of tiger reserves in India 
 The IPBES Conceptual Framework — connecting nature and people 
 Guidance manual for the valuation of regulating services. 2010. United Nations Environment Programme

References 

1961 births
Living people
Indian economists
Barkatullah University alumni